The 1935 Macdonald Brier, the Canadian men's national curling championship, was held from March 5 to 7, 1935 at the Granite Club in Toronto, Ontario.

After placing second in each of the last two Brier's, Team Ontario, who was skipped by Gordon M. Campbell finally won the Brier Tankard with a round robin record of 6-1. This was Ontario's first ever Brier championship.

New rules were instituted for the 1935 Brier, including a standardized weight for stones (45 pounds), sweeping being restricted between the near hog line and far tee line, and the abandonment of flipping a coin to decide hammer in extra ends.

Teams
The teams are listed as follows:

Round Robin standings

Round Robin results

Draw 1

Draw 2

Draw 3

Draw 4

Draw 5

Draw 6

Draw 7

References 

Macdonald Brier, 1935
Macdonald Brier, 1935
The Brier
Curling in Toronto
Macdonald Brier
Macdonald Brier
1930s in Toronto